Aforia watsoni is a species of sea snail, a marine gastropod mollusc in the family Cochlespiridae.

The name of this species is interim published.

Description
The shell grows to a length of 30 mm.

Distribution
This marine species is found off New Zealand and in the Southern Ocean, southeast of Australia; also off the Antarctic Peninsula at a depth between 210 m and 220 m.

References

 Watson, R.B. 1881. Mollusca of "H.M.S. Challenger" expedition. Parts VIII-X. Pleurotomidae. Journal of the Linnean Society of London, Zoology 15: 388–475
 Hedley, C. 1922. A revision of the Australian Turridae. Records of the Australian Museum 13(6): 213–359, pls 42–56
 Powell, A.W.B. 1969. The family Turridae in the Indo-Pacific. Part. 2. The subfamily Turriculinae. Indo-Pacific Mollusca 2(10): 207–415, pls 188–324
 Tucker, J.K. 2004. Catalog of recent and fossil turrids (Mollusca: Gastropoda). Zootaxa 682: 1–1295

External links

 Kantor Y.I., Harasewych M.G. & Puillandre N. (2016). A critical review of Antarctic Conoidea (Neogastropoda). Molluscan Research. DOI: 10.1080/13235818.2015.1128523

watsoni
Gastropods described in 2016